Jørgen Vig Knudstorp (born 21 November 1968 in Fredericia) is a Danish businessman, who is the executive chairman and former CEO of the Lego Group. He succeeded Kjeld Kirk Kristiansen.

Early years

Knudstorp was born in 1968, grew up in Fredericia and graduated from Fredericia Gymnasium before attending Aarhus University.

After obtaining his undergraduate degree, Knudstorp began an academic career as a researcher at his alma mater as well as obtaining a master's degree (1995) and a PhD (1998) in Economics from Aarhus University. He stayed in academia, but worked as a business consultant from 1998 to 2000.

Lego career
Jørgen Vig Knudstorp joined the LEGO Group in 2001 after working as a McKinsey & Company consultant
and university researcher at Aarhus University.

Under Knudstorp's tenure, LEGO Group's yearly income has gone from a loss to drawing a notable profit. and a 600% increase in turnover from 6.3 billion to 37.9 billion in 2016. In December 2016, it was announced that Knudstorp would step down as CEO of LEGO, and instead take the position of chairman of the group.

Positions outside Lego
In January 2017, Starbucks nominated Knudstorp to its board of directors.

References

External links
LEGO Company Management
Interview with Jørgen Vig Knudstorp at Monocle
Interview with Jørgen Vig Knudstorp at Meet the Boss TV
At LEGO, Growth and Culture Are Not Kid Stuff - An interview with Jorgen Vig Knudstorp
Wisdom From The Top with Guy Raz

Living people
Danish businesspeople
Danish chairpersons of corporations
Lego people
1968 births
McKinsey & Company people
Aarhus University alumni
People from Fredericia